Tricoloni or Trikolonoi was a town in ancient Arcadia. It was part of the Eutresia region. It was situated between Charisia and Zoeteium (Zoetia). It was named after its founder Tricolonus.

Its site is located northwest of the modern Karatoulas.

References

Populated places in ancient Arcadia
Former populated places in Greece